Paul Chamberlain (born 1954) is a Canadian philosopher and professor. He teaches in the areas of Christian Apologetics, Ethics and Philosophy of Religion, and is also the Director of TWU's Institute of Christian Apologetics.

Life and career
Chamberlain was born in 1954. He graduated from Trinity International University in 1981 and holds a Ph.D. in Philosophy from Marquette University. He holds additional diplomas and degrees in the following: Theological Studies, Peace River Bible Institute; Diploma in Pastoral Studies, Prairie Bible Institute; B.R.E., Providence College; Graduate Studies, Providence Theological Seminary; M.Div., Trinity International University. He currently serves as the director of the Institute of Christian Apologetics and professor of apologetics, ethics and philosophy of religion at Trinity Western University in Langley, British Columbia British Columbia. He recently held the position of Canadian Executive Director of Ravi Zacharias International Ministries. Chamberlain has pastored churches in Canada and the United States.

Chamberlain has also authored five books including Can We Be Good Without God, Final Wishes, Talking About Good And Bad Without Getting Ugly, Hell Upon Water and Why People Don't Believe, and published numerous articles in the field of ethics, physician-assisted suicide, philosophy of religion, and apologetics. He has participated widely in public debates and has made guest appearances on numerous radio and TV programs.

Writings
Why People Don't Believe: Confronting Seven Challenges to Christian Faith, 2011, Baker Books, 
 Hell Upon Water: Prisoners of War in Britain 1793-1815, 2008, Spellmount, 
Talking About Good And Bad Without Getting Ugly: A Guide To Moral Persuasion, 2005, InterVarsity Press 
Final Wishes: A Cautionary Tale on Death, Dignity & Physician-Assisted Suicide, 2000, InterVarsity Press, . In 2275 libraries, according to WorldCat 
Can We Be Good Without God? A Conversation About Truth, Morality, Culture & a Few Other Things That Matter, 1996, InterVarsity Press

References

External links
 Paul Chamberlain, Ph.D, Associate Professor of Apologetics and Philosophy, ACTS Seminaries

1954 births
20th-century Canadian philosophers
21st-century Canadian philosophers
Christian apologists
Evangelical writers
Living people
Marquette University alumni
Academic staff of Trinity Western University